Tough Love (season 1) is the first season of the American reality television series Tough Love, which first aired on VH1.  The show features eight women seeking relationship advice from the host and matchmaker, Steven Ward, and his mother JoAnn Ward, both of the Philadelphia-based Master Matchmakers.

Contestants

Episode Progress

 Taylor's performance wasn't reviewed because she became ill and was taken to the hospital before group therapy in Episode 1 and returned after the challenge in Episode 2.
Note: In episode 7, there was no hot seat, but Steve dismissed Arian from the house because he felt she wasn't learning anything from him or boot camp.

 The contestant had the best progress/date of the week
 The contestant was commended for good progress/date
 The contestant had average progress/date
 The contestant had poor progress/date
 The contestant had the worst progress/date of the week 
 The contestant left the show
 The contestant was asked to leave because Steve didn't think Boot Camp could help her.
 The contestant had good progress and was in the hot seat.

Episodes

What Men Really Think
First aired March 15, 2009

Challenge: First Impressions
Challenge Winner: Abiola
Weakest Participant: Jacklyn

Red Flags and White Lies
First aired March 22, 2009

Challenge: Zapper Dating
Challenge Winner: Jessa 
Weakest Participant: Jody

Sex and the Male Brain
First aired March 29, 2009

Challenge: Sexy Photoshoot & Lingerie Party
Challenge Winner: Jody  
Weakest Participant: Taylor

Friends Don't Let Friends Date Bitches
First aired April 5, 2009

Challenge: Bar Trivia
Challenge Winner: Taylor   
Weakest Participant:  Arian

Dollars and Sex
First aired April 12, 2009

Challenge: Perception
Challenge Winner: Jody    
Weakest Participant: Taylor
Left: Stasha

Dirty Little Secrets
First aired April 19, 2009

  
Challenge: Game Show and Secrets
Challenge Winner: Taylor
Weakest Participant: Abiola

Return of the Exes
First aired April 26, 2009

Challenge: Battling past relationships with current
Challenge Winner: Jacklyn
Left: Arian

Season Finale
First aired May 3, 2009

Left: Taylor

After the Finale

References

External links
Tough Love Official Site @ VH1.com
Tough Love - Full Episodes @ VH1.com
Meet The Cast Photos @ VH1.com

2009 American television seasons